Richard Oteng Mensah is a Ghanaian former footballer who played as a midfielder.
he has played for the swedish and dutch team

References 

Association football midfielders
Ghanaian footballers
Allsvenskan players
Superettan players
Malmö FF players
Living people
Year of birth missing (living people)